Live at the George Ballroom is a live DVD by Australian singer and songwriter, Mark Holden. A live extended play was later released digitally.

Track listing

DVD
 Commencement of Show
 "Never Gonna Fall in Love Again"
 Smithtown
 "Honey Do's"
 "Don't Give Up On Me"
 "Starting Over Again"
 Football Show Piece "Yoghurt with Paul Harrigan "
 "Shine"
 "Lady Soul"
 "Short Term Memory Loss Blues"
 "Dreams of Silver & Memories of Gold"
 "Just Plain Folks"
 "End of the Line" 
 "Building Lady Soul"
 "I Wanna Make You My Lady"
 "Never Gonna Fall in Love Again" (Promotional Clip)
 George Negus Interview
 Photogallery

 Digital Download
 "Never Gonna Fall in Love Again" – 5:00
 "Don't Give Up On Me" – 3:23
 "Shine" – 4:23
 "Short Term Memory" – 4:27
 "Dreams Of Silver & Memories Of Gold" – 5:00

Personnel
Adapted from AllMusic.

 Mark Holden – vocals, guitar
 Jeff Burstin – musical director, guitar
 Gary Young – drums
 Helen Mountford – cello
 George Butrumlis – accordion, mandolin
 Joel Turner – beat box, guitar
 Brucie Haymes – organ
 Steve Wade – backing vocals
Gary Pinto – backing vocals
Jo Creighton – backing vocals
 Roger Treble – guitar
 Dallas Holden – vocals
 Ross Ryan – vocals
 Mike Rudd – harp, vocals
 Bill Putt – slide, bass

Release history

References

Mark Holden albums
Video albums by Australian artists
2005 video albums